Jessie Lillian Furze (4 February 1903 – 5 November 1984) was an English composer and pianist. She was born in Wallington, Surrey, and studied at the Royal Academy of Music where she won the Cuthbert Nunn prize for composition. After completing her studies she worked as a music teacher. She married Willem L.F. Nijhof and died in Croydon.

Works
Furze composed over 250 works, mostly didactic music. She also published songbooks with collections of songs. Selected compositions include:
I had a dove (Text: John Keats)
Robin Redbreast
The Drummer Boy
Cheerful Sparrows
Falling Leaves
The Broken Doll published by The Associated Board of the Royal Schools of Music in 1926.
Molly-O
Grandmother's Story
The Truants
All Alone: Two's Company
Farwell Mari
Merrymakers published by The Associated Board of the Royal Schools of Music in 1927.

References

External links
"Robin Redbreast" by Jessie Furze from YouTube.

1903 births
1984 deaths
20th-century classical composers
British music educators
Women classical composers
English classical composers
20th-century English composers
20th-century English women musicians
Women music educators
20th-century women composers